Peggy O'Neal may refer to:
 Peggy O'Neal (lawyer), Australian rules football official
 Peggy O'Neal (voice actress)